Events in the year 2014 in the state of  Maharashtra in India.

Incumbents

General Elections

Lok Sabha
Results for General elections to Lok Sabha was declared on 17 May 2014. Outcomes were as follows:

Events

October
 15 October 2014: 2014 Maharashtra Legislative Assembly election
 30 October 2014: Devendra Fadnavis sworn in as the 18th Chief Minister of Maharashtra.

References